Somewhere in Between is the debut studio album by American hard rock band Systematic, released on May 22, 2001.

Track listing

Personnel

Systematic
 Tim Narducci – vocals, guitar
 Adam Ruppel – guitar, backing vocals
 Nick St. Denis – bass guitar, backing vocals
 Shaun Bannon – drums

Production
Peter Collins – Producer
 Andy Wallace – Mixer
Philip Bailey – Drum tracks
George Marino – Mastering at Sterling Sound, New York, NY
Kevin Sczymanski – Assistant engineering
Steve Sisco – Assistant mixing
Fred Paragand & Tony High – Digital media 
Lars Ulrich – Executive producer

Artwork
Nitin Vadukul – Photography
Alexis Yraola – Album Design

Management
 Nick John – Management for Rick Sales Management (Los Angeles)
 Michael Arfin – Booking Agent for Artist Group International (US)
 John Jackson – International Booking Agent at Helter Skelter 
 Jefferey Taylor Light – Legal at Myman, Abell, Fineman, Greenspan & Light, LLP
 Julie Rene – Business Agent at Provident Financial Management, (San Francisco, CA)
 Dan Mccarroll – A&R

Charts

References

2001 debut albums
Systematic (band) albums